The 2015–16 season was Leicester City's 111th season in the English football league system and their 48th (non-consecutive) season in the top tier of English football. During the season, Leicester participated in the Premier League for the second consecutive season, as well as the FA Cup and League Cup. In what was described as one of the greatest sporting stories of all time, Leicester were confirmed as champions of the 2015–16 Premier League season on 2 May 2016, finishing top of England's highest league for the first time in the club's history. The club was 5000–1 with bookmakers to win the division before the season kicked off. The feat meant that Leicester would be playing in the UEFA Champions League the following season, a first for the club in their history. The season also saw history be made for individual players within the team, as striker Jamie Vardy broke the record for consecutive games with a goal in the Premier League (11) and winger Riyad Mahrez became the first African and first Algerian player to be the recipient of the PFA Players' Player of the Year.

Pre-season events

Note: This section does not include close season transfers or pre-season match results, which are listed in their own sections below.
2 July 2015 – Dean Hammond signs a one-year contract extension until the summer of 2016.

Kit and sponsorship
Supplier: Puma / Sponsor: King Power

Friendlies

On 21 May 2015, Leicester City confirmed their first three pre-season friendlies against Lincoln City, Mansfield Town and Birmingham City. On 22 May 2015, Leicester City added a trip to Burton Albion to their pre-season schedule. On 30 June 2015, the Foxes confirmed a friendly against Rotherham United.

Events
Note: This section does not include transfers or match results, which are listed in their own sections below.
14 June 2016 – Marcin Wasilewski signed a one-year contract until the summer of 2017.
2 May 2016 – Leicester became champions of the Premier League after Tottenham Hotspur drew 2–2 with Chelsea at Stamford Bridge.

Players and staff

First team squad

Backroom staff

Transfers

In

Total spending:  £27,300,000

Out

Total incoming:  £7,000,000

Loans in

Loans out

Released

Competitions

Overview

Premier League

League table

Results summary

Results by matchday

Matches
On 17 June 2015, the fixtures for the forthcoming season were announced.

FA Cup

Leicester City entered the competition at the Third Round stage, and on 7 December 2015 they were drawn away to Tottenham Hotspur.

Football League Cup

Leicester City entered the competition in the second round and were drawn away to Bury. The third round draw was made on 25 August 2015 live on Sky Sports by Charlie Nicholas and Phil Thompson. Leicester City were drawn at home to West Ham United.

Awards

Club awards
At the end of the season, Leicester's annual award ceremony, including categories voted for by the players and backroom staff, the supporters, saw the players recognized for their achievements for the club throughout the 2015–16 season.

Divisional awards

Club statistics
All data from LCFC.com

Appearances
Starts + Substitute appearances.
Italics indicates loan player.
Asterisks indicates player left mid-season.
Hash symbol indicates player retired mid-season.

|}

Top scorers

Captains

Only counts starts as captain

Suspensions

Season summary

References

Leicester City
Leicester City F.C. seasons
17
English football championship-winning seasons